KORG-LP (95.3 FM) is a radio station licensed to serve the community of Cleveland, Texas. The station is owned by Operation Refuge, Inc. It airs an oldies music format.

The station was assigned the KORG-LP call letters by the Federal Communications Commission on May 13, 2003.

References

External links
 Official Website
 

ORG-LP
ORG-LP
Radio stations established in 2005
2005 establishments in Texas
Oldies radio stations in the United States
Liberty County, Texas